Jason Joseph Groome (born August 23, 1998) is an American professional baseball pitcher for the San Diego Padres organization. He attended Barnegat High School in Barnegat Township, New Jersey, and was considered a top prospect in the 2016 MLB draft, where he was the 12th overall selection.

High school career
Groome began high school at Barnegat High School in Barnegat Township, New Jersey. He made the school's varsity baseball team as a freshman, and as a sophomore, had a 6–2 win–loss record and 0.57 earned run average (ERA) in  innings pitched for the school's baseball team. He transferred to the IMG Academy in Bradenton, Florida, before his junior year, and committed to attend Vanderbilt University on a college baseball scholarship. Groome pitched to a 5–0 record and a 1.22 ERA with 81 strikeouts and nine walks in 43 innings as a junior.

Due to feeling homesick, Groome opted to return to Barnegat for his senior year. However, the New Jersey State Interscholastic Athletic Association ruled that Groome was ineligible to pitch for Barnegat in April 2016 because the transfer did not involve a change of address. He regained his eligibility after 30 days, or half of Barnegat's games.

Professional career

Boston Red Sox
He was a potential first overall pick in the 2016 MLB Draft, and worked out for the Philadelphia Phillies, who had the first pick. Prior to the draft, Groome changed his college commitment from Vanderbilt to Chipola College, a junior college in Florida. He was selected 12th overall by the Boston Red Sox in the draft, falling in part due to a reported signing bonus demand of $4 million and because of his change in college commitment; teams had signability concerns. The Red Sox and Groome agreed to a $3.65 million signing bonus.

In 2016, Groome made two starts for the rookie-level Gulf Coast League Red Sox  before being promoted to the Lowell Spinners of the Class A-Short Season New York-Penn League. He posted a combined 2.70 ERA in three games for the Red Sox and Spinners. He spent 2017 with both Lowell and the Greenville Drive of the Class A South Atlantic League, going 3–9 with a 5.69 ERA in 14 games between both teams.

At the start of the 2018 season, Groome did not play, with what was initially thought to be a flexor strain. On May 9, 2018, the Red Sox announced that Groome would undergo Tommy John surgery to repair a torn ulnar collateral ligament of the elbow. In April 2019, Groome was projected to return mid-way through the 2019 season; he made his first appearance on August 21, pitching an inning for the Gulf Coast League Red Sox. After another one-inning appearance in the Gulf Coast League, Groome made one appearance with Lowell; overall for the season he pitched four innings, allowing five hits and one run (2.25 ERA). After the 2020 minor league season was cancelled due to the COVID-19 pandemic, Groome was invited to participate in the Red Sox' fall instructional league. Following the 2020 season, Groome was ranked by Baseball America as the Red Sox' number six prospect.

On November 20, 2020, Groome was added to the 40-man roster. In May 2021, he was assigned to Greenville, now a High-A team. In early September, he was promoted to the Double-A Portland Sea Dogs. Overall for the 2021 season, Groome made 21 starts and compiled a 5–8 record with a 4.81 ERA.

Groome returned to Portland to start the 2022 season. The Red Sox promoted him to the Worcester Red Sox of the Triple-A International League on July 14.

San Diego Padres
On August 2, 2022, Groome was traded to the San Diego Padres in exchange for Eric Hosmer, Max Ferguson, Corey Rosier, and cash considerations.

Personal life
Groome has two older sisters and two younger brothers.  , Jay Groome was living in Fort Myers, Florida. In December 2020, Groome married Amanda Muller, also of Barnegat, New Jersey; the two were expecting their first child in July 2021.

References

Further reading

External links

SoxProspects.com

Living people
1998 births
People from Barnegat Township, New Jersey
Barnegat High School alumni
Sportspeople from Ocean County, New Jersey
Baseball pitchers
Baseball players from New Jersey
Gulf Coast Red Sox players
Lowell Spinners players
Greenville Drive players
Portland Sea Dogs players
Worcester Red Sox players